Harry Jacob Anslinger (May 20, 1892 – November 14, 1975) was a United States government official who served as the first commissioner of the U.S. Treasury Department's Federal Bureau of Narcotics during the presidencies of Herbert Hoover, Franklin D. Roosevelt, Harry S. Truman, Dwight D. Eisenhower, and John F. Kennedy. He was a supporter of Prohibition, and of the criminalization of all drugs, and spearheaded anti-drug policy campaigns.

Anslinger has been characterized as an early proponent of the war on drugs, as he zealously advocated for and pursued harsh drug penalties, in particular regarding marijuana. As a propagandist for the war on drugs, he focused on demonizing racial and immigrant groups. He targeted jazz musicians, including singer Billie Holiday.

Anslinger held office as commissioner for an unprecedented 32 years, until 1962. He then held office for two years as U.S. Representative to the United Nations Narcotics Commission. The responsibilities once held by Anslinger are now largely under the jurisdiction of the U.S. Office of National Drug Control Policy and the agency he ran was a predecessor of the Drug Enforcement Administration (DEA).

Early life
Anslinger was born in Altoona, Pennsylvania, in 1892. His father, of Swiss German origin, was Robert J. Anslinger, a barber by trade, who was born in Bern, Switzerland. His mother, Rosa Christiana Fladt, was born in the Grand Duchy of Baden (today a part of Germany). The family emigrated to the United States in 1881. Robert Anslinger worked in New York for two years, then moved to Altoona, a town founded by the Pennsylvania Railroad. In 1892, the year Harry was born, Robert Anslinger went to work for the Pennsylvania Railroad, seeking more stable employment.

Harry Anslinger followed his father in going to work for the Pennsylvania Railroad. After completing the eighth grade, he began to work with his father at the railroad, while starting with his freshman year. Aged 14, he continued to attend morning sessions in the local high school, working afternoons and evenings for the railroad. Failing to receive a high school diploma, in 1909, Harry enrolled at Altoona Business College at the age of 17, and for the next two years received additional tutoring. In 1912, he was granted a furlough permitting him to enroll at Pennsylvania State College, where he studied in a two-year associate degree program in business and engineering, while working during weekends and vacation periods.

Rise to prominence
Anslinger gained notoriety early in his career. At the age of 23 (in 1915), while working as an investigator for the Pennsylvania Railroad, he performed a detailed investigation that found the $50,000 claim of a widower in a railroad accident to be fraudulent. He saved the company the payout and was promoted to captain of railroad police.

From 1917 to 1928, Anslinger worked for various military and police organizations on stopping international drug trafficking. His duties took him all over the world, from Germany to Venezuela to Japan. He is widely credited with shaping not only America's domestic and international drug policies but influencing drug policies of other nations, particularly those that had not debated the issues internally.

By 1929, Anslinger returned from his international tour to work as an assistant commissioner in the United States' Treasury Department's Bureau of Prohibition. At that time, corruption and scandal gripped prohibition and narcotics agencies. The ensuing shake-ups and re-organizations set the stage for Anslinger, perceived as an honest and incorruptible figure, to advance not only in rank but in political stature.

In 1930, at age 38, Anslinger was appointed the founding commissioner of the Treasury's Federal Bureau of Narcotics. The illegal trade in alcohol (then still under Prohibition) and illicit drugs was targeted by the Treasury, not primarily as social evils that fell under other government purview, but as losses of untaxed revenue. Appointed by department Secretary Andrew W. Mellon, who was his wife's uncle, Anslinger was given a budget of $100,000 and wide scope.

Campaign against marijuana (cannabis) 1930–1937

Beginnings
Restrictions on cannabis (cannabis sativa, often called "Indian Hemp" in documents before the 1940s) as a drug started in local laws in New York in 1860. That was followed by local laws in many other states, and by state laws in the 1910s and 1920s. The federal Pure Food and Drug Act of 1906 regulated the labeling of patent medicines that contained "cannabis indica". In 1925, in the International Opium Convention, the United States supported regulation of "Indian hemp" in its use as a drug. Recommendations from the International Opium Convention inspired the work with the Uniform State Narcotic Act between 1925 and 1932.

Anslinger had not been active in that process until approximately 1930. Anslinger collected stories of marijuana causing crime and violence, and ignored evidence that allowed for other interpretations. Doctor Walter Bromberg pointed out that substance abuse and crime are heavily confounded and that none of a group of 2,216 criminal convictions he had examined was clearly connected to marijuana's influence. He also ignored a discussion forwarded to him by the American Medical Association, in which 29 of 30 pharmacists and drug industry representatives objected to his proposals to ban marijuana. One such statement claimed that the proposal was "Absolute rot. It is not necessary. I have never known of its misuse.". However, only the single dissenter (who noted he had once encountered a doctor who had been addicted to marijuana) was preserved in Bureau files.

As head of the Federal Bureau of Narcotics, Anslinger sought, and ultimately received, an increase of reports about smoking of marijuana in 1936 that continued to spread at an accelerated pace in 1937. Before that, the smoking of marijuana had been relatively slight and confined to the Southwest, particularly along the Mexican border.

Enforcement 
The Bureau first prepared a legislative plan to seek a new law from Congress that would place marijuana and its distribution directly under federal control. Second, Anslinger ran a campaign against marijuana on radio and at major forums.  His view was clear, ideological and judgmental:

By using the mass media as his forum, and receiving much support from yellow journalism publisher William Randolph Hearst, Anslinger propelled the anti-marijuana sentiment from state level to a national movement. He used what he called his "Gore Files" - a collection of quotes from police reports - to graphically depict offenses caused by drug users. They were written in the terse and concise language of a police report. His most infamous story in The American Magazine concerned Victor Licata, who killed his family:

This story was referenced in the 1937 anti-weed film “Reefer Madness”. It is one of 200 violent crimes which were documented in Anslinger's "Gore Files" series. It has since been discovered that Licata murdered his family due to severe mental illness, which had been diagnosed early in his youth, and not because of cannabis use. Researchers have now proved that Anslinger wrongly attributed 198 of the "Gore Files" stories to marijuana usage, and the remaining "two cases could not be disproved because no records existed concerning the crimes." During the 1937 Marijuana Tax Act hearings, Anslinger rehashed the 1933 Licata killings while giving testimony to Congress.

Contemporary racial prejudice 
In the 1930s, Anslinger's anti-marijuana articles often contained racist themes, to the point that contemporary conservative politicians at one point called for Anslinger to resign based solely on his open racist remarks:

Though these stories were often true (whatever the role of cannabis in them), Anslinger's basic attitude was shown in remarks not related to any particular story, such as:

According to Johann Hari, the Federal Bureau of Narcotics under Anslinger targeted Billie Holiday after her 1939 song "Strange Fruit,". Hari wrote that Anslinger assigned an agent to track her after she refused to stop speaking out about racism. According to Hari, Anslinger used the war on drugs as a pretext for the Federal Bureau of Narcotics who had little to do following the end of prohibition. Hari states that Anslinger hated addicts, Latinos, and African Americans and that Anslinger was "so racist that he was regarded as a crazy racist in the 1920s."  However, these allegations have been disputed, with historian Lewis Porter noting that "there was no federal objection to the song “Strange Fruit,” nor was there any campaign to suppress it" and Holiday was instead pursued by Bureau of Narcotics mainly for her history of drug use. Porter writes that Johann Hari's, 2015 book, Chasing the Scream: The First and Last Days of the War on Drugs, is where the allegation that Holiday was targeted for singing "Strange Fruit" originated and that this claim didn't appear anywhere else before that.

In his 1964 book, The Protectors, Anslinger included a chapter called "Jazz and Junk Don't Mix", about black jazz musicians Billie Holiday, who had been handcuffed on her death bed due to suspicion of drug use and possession, and Charlie Parker, who both died after years of illegal heroin and alcohol abuse:

Anslinger hoped to orchestrate a nationwide dragnet of jazz musicians and kept a file called "Marijuana and Musicians."

Campaign assessment
Some critics of Anslinger claim his campaign against marijuana had a hidden agenda rooted in commercial interests not societal welfare. One example of this sort of thing is that the E. I. DuPont De Nemours And Company industrial firm, petrochemical interests and William Randolph Hearst conspired together to create the highly sensational anti-marijuana campaign so as to eliminate hemp as an industrial competitor to synthetic materials. However, the DuPont Company and industrial historians have dismissed any link between development of nylon and changes in the laws relating to hemp (marijuana); pointing out nylon was a huge success from the start. It was not until 1934, and his fourth year in office, that Anslinger considered marijuana to be a serious threat to American society (Wallace Carothers first synthesized nylon on February 28, 1935). This was part of a worldwide trend, unrelated to racial issues in America; The League of Nations had already implemented restrictions on marijuana in the beginning of the 1930s, and many states in the U.S. had started restricting it in the years before Anslinger was appointed. In 1935, both president Franklin D. Roosevelt and his attorney general publicly supported the campaign. Anslinger was part the government's broader push to alarm the public about the danger of recreational drugs and to outlaw them. He did this with reference to his own agenda.

The La Guardia Committee, promoted in 1939 by New York Mayor Fiorello La Guardia, was the first in-depth study into the effects of smoking marijuana. It systematically contradicted claims made by the U.S. Treasury Department that smoking marijuana resulted in insanity, and determined that "the practice of smoking marihuana does not lead to addiction in the medical sense of the word." Released in 1944, the report infuriated Anslinger, who condemned it as unscientific.

Later years
Later in his career, Anslinger was scrutinized for insubordination by refusing to desist from an attempt to halt the ABA/AMA Joint Report on Narcotic Addiction, a publication edited by the sociology Professor Alfred R. Lindesmith of Indiana University. Among other works, Lindesmith wrote Opiate Addiction (1947), The Addict and the Law (1965), and a number of articles condemning the criminalization of addiction. Nearly everything Lindesmith did was critical of the War on Drugs, and he specifically condemned Anslinger's role. The AMA/ABA controversy is sometimes credited with ending Anslinger's position of Commissioner of the Federal Bureau of Narcotics.

In his later years Anslinger also suffered a mental breakdown characterized by intense paranoia and irrational thoughts, such as believing that addiction was 'contagious' and addicts had to be 'quarantined' or talking about 'secret plots' throughout the world; he was eventually hospitalized because of this breakdown.

Anslinger was surprised to be re-appointed by President John F. Kennedy in February 1961. The new president had a tendency to invigorate the government with more youthful civil servants and, by 1962, Anslinger was 70 years old, the mandatory age for retirement in his position. In addition, during the previous year, he had witnessed his wife Martha's slow and agonizing death due to heart failure, and had lost some of his drive and ambition. On his 70th birthday, May 20, 1962, Anslinger submitted his resignation to Kennedy. Because Kennedy did not have a successor in place, however, Anslinger stayed on in his $18,500 a year ($145,733 when adjusted for inflation in 2014 dollars) position until later that year. He was succeeded by Henry Giordano in August. Following that, he was the United States' Representative to the United Nations Narcotics Commission for two years, after which he retired.

By 1973, Anslinger was completely blind, had a debilitatingly enlarged prostate gland, and suffered from angina. Ironically, when he died, Anslinger was being treated with regular doses of morphine, which had been prescribed for him for his angina.

Additionally, Anslinger provided morphine to Senator Joseph McCarthy, who was addicted to both alcohol and morphine. When Anslinger tried to persuade McCarthy to quit morphine, McCarthy reminded him of the potential for a public scandal. Anslinger relented and steadily supplied McCarthy with morphine that was paid for by the Bureau and obtained from a local drugstore. This arrangement continued until McCarthy's death in 1957.

On November 14, 1975, at 1 p.m., Anslinger died of heart failure at the former Mercy Hospital (now known as Bon Secours Hospital Campus of the Altoona Regional Health System) in Altoona, Pennsylvania. He was 83, and was buried at the Hollidaysburg Presbyterian Cemetery in Hollidaysburg, Pennsylvania.

He was survived by his son, Joseph Leet Anslinger, and a sister. According to John McWilliams's 1990 book, The Protectors: Harry J. Anslinger and the Federal Bureau of Narcotics (1930–1962), Anslinger's daughter-in-law Bea at that time still lived in Anslinger's home in Hollidaysburg.

In the media
Anslinger appears as himself in the 1948 adventure movie about breaking an international drug ring, To the Ends of the Earth
 In 1973, Anslinger was portrayed by actor Edmond O'Brien in the film Lucky Luciano by Francesco Rosi, with Gian Maria Volonté.
 Anslinger's role in the drug war is documented in the 2015 book Chasing the Scream by Johann Hari.
 Anslinger's targeting of Billie Holiday and his role in the earliest days of the drug war are discussed in NPR's podcast Throughline, Episode "Strange Fruit"
 Garrett Hedlund portrays Anslinger in the 2021  docudrama The United States vs. Billie Holiday on Hulu.
 Rainn Wilson portrays Anslinger in the 2021 podcast Toxicomanía: el experimento mexicano

Publications
The Traffic in Narcotics, with William Finley Tompkins. Funk & Wagnalls, 1953.

See also

 LaGuardia Commission
 Havana Conference
 Legal history of marijuana in the United States
 Legal issues of cannabis
 L. G. Nutt
 Prohibition of drugs
War on Drugs
The United States vs. Billie Holiday

References

Further reading
 Chasing the Scream: The First and Last Days of the War on Drugs, by Johann Hari, 2015
 Larry Sloman, Reefer Madness: A History of Marijuana in America (Indianapolis: Bobbs–Merrill, 1979)
The Traffic in Narcotics: An interview with the Hon. Harry J. Anslinger United States Commissioner of Narcotics, Jan. 1, 1954
 
HARRY J. ANSLINGER, WILL OURSLER:THE STORY OF THE NARCOTIC GANGS, 1961
 Who Was Who in America with World Notables, Vol VI 1974–1976, by Marquis Who's Who, 1976
 
 The Protectors: Harry J. Anslinger and the Federal Bureau of Narcotics (1930–1962), by John C. McWilliams, University of Delaware Press, 1990
 The War on Drugs II, J. A. Inciardi, California: Mayfield Publishing Company, 1992
 Cannabis: A History, Martin Booth, Picador USA, 2005

External links
 
Harry J. Anslinger, Commissioner of the US Bureau of Narcotics, "Marijuana: assassin of Youth", The American Magazine, July 1937
Statement by Harry J. Anslinger, Commissioner of the US Bureau of Narcotics, to the Senate Ways and Means Committee, 1937
Guide to the H.J. Anslinger Papers, 1835–1970, Pennsylvania State University 

1892 births
1975 deaths
Heads of United States federal agencies
People from Altoona, Pennsylvania
Pennsylvania State University alumni
History of racism in the United States
American people of German descent
American people of Swiss descent
Cannabis law in the United States
Franklin D. Roosevelt administration personnel
Truman administration personnel
Eisenhower administration personnel
Kennedy administration personnel
History of drug control
Marihuana Tax Act of 1937
20th-century United States government officials
Cannabis prohibition
American white supremacists
Drug policy of the United States
Prohibition in the United States